Ecpyrrhorrhoe multispinalis is a moth in the family Crambidae. It was described by Qiang Gao, Dan-Dan Zhang and Shu-Xia Wang in 2013. It is found in Tianjin, China.

References

Moths described in 2013
Pyraustinae